Deltabreen (The Delta Glacier) is a glacier at Edgeøya, Svalbard. The glacier debouches into the lagoon of Tjuvfjordlaguna, at the eastern side of Dyrdalen.

References

Glaciers of Svalbard
Edgeøya